Badesi (Gallurese: Badèsi) is a comune (municipality) in the Province of Sassari in the Italian region Sardinia, located about  north of Cagliari and about  west of Olbia.

Badesi borders the following municipalities: Trinità d'Agultu e Vignola, Valledoria, Viddalba.

Demographic evolution

References

Cities and towns in Sardinia
1969 establishments in Italy
States and territories established in 1969